Minority languages are spoken in a number of autochthonous settlements in Austria. These are: 
Croatian and Romany in Burgenland, 
Czech and Slovak in Vienna, 
Hungarian in Burgenland and Vienna, and 
Slovene in Carinthia and Styria. 

The Austrian Federal Constitution calls for the respect and promotion of ethnic groups resident in Austria and a special set of rights for Austrian Croats, Czechs, Hungarians, Romani, Slovaks and Slovenes was established under the terms of the Ethnic Group Act 1976. The rights of Croats and Slovenes are also set forth in the Austrian State Treaty. Austria signed the European Charter for Regional or Minority Languages on 5 November 1992 and application of the charter became effective under international law on 1 October 2001. 

In the view of the representatives of the speakers of minority languages, however, the federal laws concerning regional or minority languages, as well as the application in Austria of the European Charter for Regional or Minority Languages, remain too restrictive.

Official Minority Languages

Slovene 
The Slovene-speaking community in Austria is traditionally inhabiting a strip of territory in Austrian states of Carinthia and Styria. Significantly larger part of the community is living in Carinthia. The entire community is bilingual in German as well, and the local Slovene dialect is not entirely the same as standard Slovene. The Carinthian group of Slovene dialects extends beyond the present borders of Carinthia. Carinthian Slovene dialects are spoken throughout Slovenian Carinthia and extend into the Pohorje Mountains and along the upper Drava Valley in Slovenian Styria. Additionally, a Carinthian Slovene dialect is spoken in the Upper Carniolan locality of Rateče in Slovenia (close to the border with Italy), whereas in the nearby town of Kranjska Gora, a transitional dialect between Carinthian and Upper Carniolan is spoken. Official Census in 1991 reported 15,500 Slovene speakers in the state of Carinthia with some estimates going up to 31,000 or 5,7% of the state's population at the time. Slovenian Gymnasium in Klagenfurt is the central educational institution of the Slovene speaking community in Austria. In 1992 there was 3,000 pupils enrolled in bilingual classes.

During the time of the Socialist Federal Republic of Yugoslavia its authorities and authorities of constituent Socialist Republic of Slovenia and Socialist Republic of Croatia have been involved in a series of disputes over the treatment of ethnic minorities in Austria. Slovenian dissatisfaction was caused by difference in interpretation of Austrian State Treaty and Carinthian decision to end compulsory bilingual schooling in 1958. In April 1971 Slovene "Contact Committee" expressed their dissatisfaction in a memorandum to the Austrian Chancellor Bruno Kreisky in which they have listed requests for specific measures for the protection of Slovene. On 11 November 1976 approximately 150,000 people in Ljubljana participated in an officially sponsored protest in solidarity with Slovene community.

References 

Languages of Austria
Austria